Johannes Trithemius (1 February 1462 – 13 December 1516), born Johann Heidenberg, was a German Benedictine abbot and a polymath who was active in the German Renaissance as a lexicographer, chronicler, cryptographer, and occultist. He is considered the founder of modern cryptography (a claim shared with Leon Battista Alberti) and steganography, as well as the founder of bibliography and literary studies as branches of knowledge. He had considerable influence on the development of early modern and modern occultism. His students included Heinrich Cornelius Agrippa and Paracelsus.

Early life
The byname Trithemius refers to his native town of Trittenheim on the Moselle River, at the time part of the Electorate of Trier.

When Johannes was still an infant his father, Johann von Heidenburg, died. His stepfather, whom his mother Elisabeth married seven years later, was hostile to education and thus Johannes could only learn in secret and with many difficulties. He learned Greek, Latin, and Hebrew. When he was 17 years old he escaped from his home and wandered around looking for good teachers, travelling to Trier, Cologne, the Netherlands, and Heidelberg. He studied at the University of Heidelberg.

Career
Travelling from the university to his home town in 1482, he was surprised by a snowstorm and took refuge in the Benedictine abbey of Sponheim near Bad Kreuznach. He decided to stay and was elected abbot in 1483, at the age of twenty-one. He often served as featured speaker and chapter secretary at the Bursfelde Congregation's annual chapter from 1492 to 1503, the annual meeting of reform-minded abbots. Trithemius also supervised the visits of the Congregation's abbeys.

Trithemius wrote extensively as a historian, starting with a chronicle of Sponheim and culminating in a two-volume work on the history of Hirsau Abbey. His work was distinguished by mastery of the Latin language and eloquent phrasing, yet it was soon discovered that he inserted several fictional passages into his works. 
Even during Trithemius's lifetime, several critics pointed out the invented sources he used.
 His forgery regarding the connection between the Franks and the Trojans was part of a larger project to establish a link between the current dynasty of Austria with ancient heroes. While his colleagues like Jakob Mennel and Ladislaus Suntheim often inserted invented ancestors in their works, Trithemius invented entire sources, such as Hunibald, supposedly a Scythian historian. For his research on monasteries, he utilized “Meginfrid,” an imagined early chronicler of Fulda and Meginfrid's nonexistent treatise De temporibus gratiae to substantiate Trithemius's ideal of monastic piety and erudition, which were supposed to be the same values shared by the monks of the ninth century. Others opine that Meginfrid was not strictly forgery but the combination of wishful thinking with faulty memory.

In the process though, Trithemius became a famous builder of libraries, which he created in Sponheim and Würzburg. In Sponheim, he set out to transform the abbey from a neglected and undisciplined place into a centre of learning. In his time, the abbey library increased from around fifty items to more than two thousand.

His efforts did not meet with praise, and his reputation as a magician did not further his acceptance. Increasing differences with the convent led to his resignation in 1506, when he decided to take up the offer of the Bishop of Würzburg, Lorenz von Bibra (bishop from 1495 to 1519), to become the abbot of St. James's Abbey, the Schottenkloster in Würzburg. He remained there until the end of his life.

Trithemius seemed to have a falling out with Maximilian regarding their differences when the emperor wanted to organize a separate ecclesiastical council in 1511, in slight of Pope Julius II. The relationship recovered after Julius's death, though.

Death
Trithemius was buried in St. James's Abbey's church; a tombstone by the famous Tilman Riemenschneider was erected in his honor. In 1825, the tombstone was moved to the Neumünster church, next to the cathedral. It was damaged in the firebombing of 1945, and subsequently restored by the workshop of Theodor Spiegel.

Legacy
Notably, the German polymath, physician, legal scholar, soldier, theologian, and occult writer Heinrich Cornelius Agrippa (1486–1535) and the Swiss physician, alchemist, and astrologer Paracelsus (1493–1541) were among his pupils.

Steganographia

Trithemius' most famous work, Steganographia (written c. 1499; published Frankfurt, 1606), was placed on the Index Librorum Prohibitorum in 1609 and removed in 1900. This book is in three volumes, and appears to be about magic—specifically, about using spirits to communicate over long distances. Since the publication of the decryption key to the first two volumes in 1606, they have been known to be actually concerned with cryptography and steganography. Until recently, the third volume was widely still believed to be solely about magic, but the "magical" formulae have now been shown to be covertexts for yet more cryptographic content. However, mentions of the magical work within the third book by such figures as Agrippa and John Dee still lend credence to the idea of a mystic-magical foundation concerning the third volume. Additionally, while Trithemius's steganographic methods can be established to be free of the need for angelic–astrological mediation, still left intact is an underlying theological motive for their contrivance. The preface to the Polygraphia equally establishes that the everyday practicability of cryptography was conceived by Trithemius as a "secular consequent of the ability of a soul specially empowered by God to reach, by magical means, from earth to Heaven". Robert Hooke suggested, in the chapter Of Dr. Dee's Book of Spirits, that John Dee made use of Trithemian steganography to conceal his communication with Queen Elizabeth I. Amongst the codes used in this book is the Ave Maria cipher, where each coded letter is replaced by a short sentence about Jesus in Latin.

The reason for Polygraphia and Steganographia as covertexts being written are unknown. Possible explanations are that either its real target audience was the selected few such as Maximilian, or that Trithemius wanted to attract public attention to a tedious field.

Works

 Exhortationes ad monachos, 1486
 De institutione vitae sacerdotalis, 1486
 De regimine claustralium, 1486
 De visitatione monachorum, about 1490
 Catalogus illustrium virorum Germaniae, 1491–1495
 De laude scriptorum manualium, 1492 (printed 1494) Zum Lob der Schreiber; Freunde Mainfränkischer Kunst and Geschichte e. V., Würzburg 1973, (Latin/German)
 De viris illustribus ordinis sancti Benedicti, 1492
 In laudem et commendatione Ruperti quondam abbatis Tuitiensis, 1492
 De origine, progressu et laudibus ordinis fratrum Carmelitarum, 1492
 Liber penthicus seu lugubris de statu et ruina ordinis monastici, 1493
 De proprietate monachorum, before 1494
 De vanitate et miseria humanae vitae, before 1494
 Liber de scriptoribus ecclesiasticis, 1494
 De laudibus sanctissimae matris Annae, 1494
 De scriptoribus ecclesiasticis, 1494
 Chronicon Hirsaugiense, 1495–1503
 Chronicon Sponheimense, c. 1495-1509 - Chronik des Klosters Sponheim, 1024-1509; Eigenverlag Carl Velten, Bad Kreuznach 1969 (German)
 De cura pastorali, 1496
 De duodecim excidiis oberservantiae regularis, 1496
 De triplici regione claustralium et spirituali exercitio monachorum, 1497
 Steganographia, c. 1499
 Chronicon successionis ducum Bavariae et comitum Palatinorum, c. 1500-1506
 Nepiachus, 1507
 De septem secundeis id est intelligentiis sive spiritibus orbes post deum moventibus, c. 1508 (The Seven Secondary Intelligences, 1508), a history of the world based on astrology;
 Antipalus maleficiorum, 1508
 Polygraphia, written 1508, published 1518
 Annales Hirsaugienses, 1509–1514. The full title is Annales hirsaugiensis...complectens historiam Franciae et Germaniae, gesta imperatorum, regum, principum, episcoporum, abbatum, et illustrium virorum, Latin for "The Annals of Hirsau...including the history of France and Germany, the exploits of the emperors, kings, princes, bishops, abbots, and illustrious men". Hirsau was a monastery near Württemberg, whose abbot commissioned the work in 1495, but it took Trithemius until 1514 to finish the two-volume, 1,400-page work. It was first printed in 1690. Some consider this work to be one of the first humanist history books.
 Compendium sive breviarium primi voluminis chronicarum sive annalium de origine regum et gentis Francorum, c. 1514
 De origine gentis Francorum compendium, 1514 - An abridged history of the Franks / Johannes Trithemius; AQ-Verlag, Dudweiler 1987;  (Latin/English)
 Liber octo quaestionum, 1515
Compilations
 Marquard Freher, Opera historica, Minerva, Frankfurt/Main, 1966
 Johannes Busaeus, Opera pia et spiritualia (1604 and 1605)
 Johannes Busaeus, Paralipomena opuscolorum (1605 and 1624)

See also 
Augustus the Younger, Duke of Brunswick-Lüneburg
 Humanism in Germany
 Minuscule 96 – written by the hand of Trithemius
 Tabula recta
 Trithemius cipher
 Theban alphabet

Notes

References

 Brann, N. L. (1981). The Abbot Trithemius, Leiden: Brill
 Kahn, David (1967). The Codebreakers: the Story of Secret Writing, 1967, 2nd edition 1996, pp. 130–137 
 Kuhn, Rudolf (1968). Großer Führer durch Würzburgs Dom und Neumünster: mit Neumünster-Kreuzgang und Walthergrab, p. 108
 
 Christel Steffen (1969). "Untersuchungen zum "Liber de scriptoribus ecclesiasticis" des Johannes Trithemius", Aus: Archiv für Geschichte des Buchwesens Bd 10, Lfg 4 - 5 [1969] 1247 - 1354.

External links 

 
 Steganographia (Latin). Digital Edition, 1997
 Steganographia (Latin). Google Books, 1608 edition
 Steganographia (Latin). Google Books, 1621 edition
 Solved: The Ciphers in Book iii of Trithemius's Steganographia, PDF, 208 kB  
 Hill Monastic Manuscript Library article on Trithemius (includes links to photographs of various Trithemius first editions.)
  The complete and solved Steganography books
 
 
Polygraphiae libri sex Ioannis Trithemij From George Fabyan Collection at the Library of Congress
Steganographia qvæ hvcvsqve a nemine intellecta From George Fabyan Collection at the Library of Congress
Trithemius Redivivus Translations and resources pertaining to the Steganographia of Johannes Trithemius
 
 
 
 Latin works in the Analytic Bibliography of On-Line Neo-Latin Texts
 De septem secundeis in German translation (Über die sieben Erzengel, die nach dem Willen Gottes die Planeten bewegen und die Geschicke der Welt lenken)
 Johannes Trithemius Gemeinde Trittenheim

1462 births
1516 deaths
People from Bernkastel-Wittlich
15th-century German writers
16th-century German writers
16th-century German male writers
16th-century Latin-language writers
German Benedictines
German occult writers
Medieval German astrologers
German Renaissance humanists
Medieval German theologians
Creators of writing systems
People from the Electorate of Trier
Pre-19th-century cryptographers
15th-century Latin writers
Steganography
Angelologists
Heidelberg University alumni
German male non-fiction writers